Academic titles may refer to:

 Academic degrees
 Academic ranks
 Titles of works in academic publishing

Academic terminology